Evald Aavik (born on 24 January 1941 in Kuressaare) is an Estonian actor.

In 1965 he graduated from Vanemuine Theatre's stage art studio (diploma nr 1). 1966–1988 he worked at Vanemuine Theatre, 1986–1989 in Ugala Theatre and 1989–1993 in Estonian Youth Theatre. Besides theatre roles he has played also in several films.

Filmography
 Inimesed sõdurisinelis (1968)
 Reigi õpetaja (1977) (role: Jako)
 Tuulte pesa (1979) (role: foreigner)
 Jõulud Vigalas (1980) (role: Bernhard Laipmann)
 Naerata ometi (1985)
 Näkimadalad (1989)
 Doktor Stockmann (1989)
 Ainus pühapäev (1990) (role: father)
 Perekondlik sündmus (1998) (role: grandfather)
 Georgica (1998) (role: Jakub)
 Somnambuul (2003) (role: Gottfrid)
 Räägitakse, et tomatid armastavad rokkmuusikat (2016) (role: Aleksander)
 Mehetapja/Süütu/Vari (2017) (role: Heino)

References

Living people
1941 births
Estonian male stage actors
Estonian male film actors
Estonian male television actors
20th-century Estonian male actors
21st-century Estonian male actors
People from Kuressaare